Putaqa (Quechua for Rumex peruanus, also spelled Putaja) is a mountain in Peru which reaches a height of approximately . It is located in the Pasco Region, Pasco Province, Paucartambo District.

References

Mountains of Peru
Mountains of Pasco Region